Eleanor Fortescue-Brickdale (25 January 1872 – 10 March 1945) was a British artist known for her paintings, book illustrations, and a number of works in stained glass.

Life
Fortescue-Brickdale was born at her parents' house, Birchamp Villa in Upper Norwood, Surrey as Mary Eleanor Fortescue Brickdale the daughter of Matthew and Sarah Fortescue Brickdale. Her father was a barrister. She was trained first at the Crystal Palace School of Art, under Herbert Bone and entered the Royal Academy Schools in 1896. In that year she also exhibited a work at the Royal Academy, RA, and won a prize for designing a lunette, Spring for the RA Dining Room.  Her first major painting was The Pale Complexion of True Love (1899). She soon began exhibiting her oil paintings at the Royal Academy, and her watercolours at the Dowdeswell Gallery, where she had several solo exhibitions.

While at the academy, Fortescue-Brickdale came under the influence of John Byam Liston Shaw, a protégé of John Everett Millais much influenced by John William Waterhouse. When Byam Shaw founded his art school in 1911, Fortescue-Brickdale became a teacher there.

In 1909, Ernest Brown, of the Leicester Galleries, commissioned a series of 28 watercolour illustrations to Tennyson's Idylls of the King, which Fortescue-Brickdale painted over two years. They were exhibited at the gallery in 1911, and 24 of them were published the following year in a deluxe edition of the first four Idylls.

She lived during much of her career in Holland Park Road, opposite Leighton House, where she held an exhibition in 1904.

Fortescue-Brickdale exhibited at the first exhibition of the Society of Graphic Art in 1921. Her 1921 World War I memorial to the King's Own Yorkshire Light Infantry is in York Minster. 

Later, she also worked with stained glass. She was a staunch Christian, and donated works to churches. Amongst her best known works are The Uninvited Guest and Guinevere. She died on 10 March 1945, and is buried at Brompton Cemetery, London.

Books illustrated
 Poems by Tennyson, 1905
 Pippa Passes by Robert Browning, 1908
 Men and Women by Browning, 1908
 Dramatis Personae by Browning, 1909
 Dramatic Romances and Lyrics by Browning, 1909
 Idylls of the King by Tennyson, 1911
 Story of St Elizabeth of Hungary by WM Canton, 1912
 Book of Ols English Songs and Ballaids by WM Canton, 1915
 Eleanor Fortescue Brickdale's Golden Book of Famous Women, 1919
 The Sweet and Touching Tale of Fleure and Blanchfleure, 1922
 Carols, 1925
 Golden Treasury of Songs and Lyrics published by Palgrave, 1925
 A Diary of an Eighteenth Century Garden, Calthorp, 1926.

Works

Golden book of famous women (1919)

See also
 Women artists

References
  
 Pamela Gerrish Nunn (2012). A Pre-Raphaelite Journey.

External links

 
 
 
Paintings by E. Fortescue-Brickdale (Art Renewal Center)
Paintings by E. Fortescue-Brickdale (Pre-Raphaelite Women)
E. Fortescue-Brickdale - short biography and works ("Celtic Twilight")
Eleanor Fortesque Brickdale's Golden Book of Famous Women, London, New York, Toronto: Hodder and Stoughton, 1919.

1871 births
1945 deaths
20th-century English painters
20th-century English women artists
Academics of the Byam Shaw School of Art
Burials at Brompton Cemetery
English illustrators
English watercolourists
English women painters
Painters from London
People from Upper Norwood
Pre-Raphaelite stained glass artists
Women watercolorists